A waterbody number, waterbody index number or waterbody ID is used for the hydrographic classification of waterbodies. Where classification only covers bodies of flowing water such as rivers, it may be called a watercourse number.

Many different systems are used in limnology to number waterbodies such as lakes, rivers and streams, ranging from basic index numbers representing their location in the river system, such as serial numbers for the major catchment areas of the rivers, or numbers indicating their hierarchical position in the system. On the basis of such numbers the aim is to give waterbodies, river sections or catchment areas a clear  identification number. As a result of the systems used in various specialist fields there may even be different national and regional waterbody index numbers for the same body of water.

Stream order 
A general geographical and hydrographical classification uses Strahler numbers to determine the:
 Stream order – the level of the waterbody in the hydrographical hierarchical classification system (there are several different systems)

National terminology or systems 
 Gewässerkennzahl ("watercourse index number"), Germany
 HZB Code ("waterbody index number"; legally defined, HZB code, OWK No., WRRL codes), Austria
 River basin number (järvinumero), Finland
 Sandre, France
 Watercourse number, Pakistan
 State Water Register, Russia
 Gewässerlaufnummer ("waterbody serial number"), Switzerland
 Čislo hydrologického pořadí ("hydrological order number"), Czech Republic
 Waterbody number, waterbody ID, United Kingdom
 Waterbody number, waterbody index number, Geographic Names Information System, United States

See also 
Hydrological-ecological classifications:
 Water quality
 Bathing water quality – classification based on EU Directive 2006/7/EG

Limnology
Identifiers
Hydrology